Christian Fickert (born 10 February 1981 in Mannheim) is a former German footballer, who plays for SpVgg Wallstadt.

Fickert was in the German squad for the 2001 FIFA World Youth Championship, but didn't make an appearance.

References

External links 
 
 Christian Fickert at dfb.de

1981 births
Living people
Footballers from Mannheim
German footballers
Germany youth international footballers
Association football defenders
2. Bundesliga players
SV Waldhof Mannheim players
Rot-Weiss Essen players
SV Sandhausen players
21st-century German people